Paul Redford is an American television writer and producer. Redford's family, originally Canadian, moved to Mission Hills, Kansas in the early 1970s. Paul graduated from Shawnee Mission East High School in 1976, and in 1980 from Harvard University, where he wrote for the Harvard Lampoon and appeared in numerous plays, including experimental work by classmate Peter Sellars.  After Harvard he acted for the Boston Shakespeare Company and the Denver Center Theatre Company (DCTC), before moving to Los Angeles in 198.

Redford was a story editor and writer for Aaron Sorkin's Sports Night. He also worked on Sorkin's next series The West Wing. Redford joined the crew in the first season as a story editor and regular writer. Redford and his co-writers (Sorkin and Lawrence O'Donnell) won a Humanitas Prize in the 60 minute category in 2000 for their episode "Take this Sabbath Day". The episode was also nominated for a WGA Award for best episodic drama.

Redford was promoted to co-producer for the second season and continued to write episodes. Redford and Sorkin were again nominated for a WGA Award for best episodic drama for their work on the second-season episode "Somebody's Going to Emergency, Somebody's Going to Jail". Part way through the third season Redford was promoted again to producer. He returned as a producer and writer for the fourth season. Redford was nominated a third time for the WGA Award for best episodic drama for his work on the fourth-season episode "Game On", which was once again co-written with Sorkin.

He was promoted again in the fourth season to supervising producer. Redford and his fellow producers won the Emmy Award for Outstanding Drama Series in 2003 for their work on The West Wing season four. Redford returned as a supervising producer for the fifth season. The production team were nominated for the Emmy Award for Outstanding Drama Series in 2004 for their work on the fifth season.

He went on to work as a co-executive producer for LAX and The Unit. He was an executive producer for short-lived Fox drama Vanished. He was hired by his West Wing and Sports Night colleague Kevin Falls as a consulting producer on Falls' series Journeyman.

In 2008 he joined the crew of Dirty Sexy Money as a writer and co-executive producer. He co-wrote the episode "The Injured Party" (with Sallie Patrick) and wrote the episode "The Unexpected Arrival". The show was canceled after the second season. In 2010 Redford wrote the Big Love fourth-season episode "The Greater Good" and was the co-executive producer for two episodes of that series.

Filmography

Producer

Writer

References

External links
 

Living people
American television writers
American male television writers
The Harvard Lampoon alumni
Year of birth missing (living people)